Bobber may refer to:
 Bobber (fishing), a small float used in angling to suspend the lure at a predetermined depth
Bobber (motorcycle), a motorcycle with many standard parts removed to reduce weight or to present a "clean" or minimalist aesthetic
Bobber Caboose, rail road car with four wheels (two axle) rather than the standard eight